Jake Daniel Stewart  (born March 10, 1978) is a Canadian politician who was elected to the Legislative Assembly of New Brunswick in the 2010 provincial election. He represented the electoral district of Southwest Miramichi as a member of the Progressive Conservatives. He resigned on August 17, 2021 and was elected the Conservative Member of Parliament for the riding of Miramichi—Grand Lake on September 20, 2021.

Political career
Stewart entered municipal politics in 2008, having run for the office of councillor in his hometown of Blackville. In 2010, he entered provincial politics, and defeated incumbent Liberal MLA Rick Brewer, who at that time was the Minister of Human Resources.

Stewart was a member of the Standing Committees on Education, Private Bills, Procedure, Public Accounts, and Chaired the Standing Committee on Legislative Officers. He has also been appointed by Jody Carr, then current Minister of Education to sit on the Ministerial Advisory Committee on Positive Learning and Working Environment (Anti Bullying).

Reelected in 2014, Stewart is the opposition critic for Energy and Mines, and Aboriginal Affairs. He is a member of the Standing Committee on Economic Policy.

In 2016, he entered the Progressive Conservative  leadership race.

Electoral record

Federal

Provincial

Blackville
Municipal election 2008

Election for Councillor

References

External links

1978 births
Progressive Conservative Party of New Brunswick MLAs
Living people
21st-century Canadian politicians
Members of the Executive Council of New Brunswick
Members of the House of Commons of Canada from New Brunswick
Conservative Party of Canada MPs